

Karl von Graffen (6 June 1893 – 1 November 1964) was a German general during World War II who held divisional and corps level commands. He was a recipient of the Knight's Cross of the Iron Cross of Nazi Germany. Graffen was taken prisoner in May 1945 by the US 85th Infantry Division near Belluno, Italy, and was released in March 1948.

Awards and decorations

 Knight's Cross of the Iron Cross on 13 August 1942 as Generalmajor and commander of 58. Infanterie-Division

References

 
 
 
 

1893 births
1964 deaths
Military personnel from Schleswig-Holstein
Lieutenant generals of the German Army (Wehrmacht)
German Army personnel of World War I
Recipients of the clasp to the Iron Cross, 1st class
Recipients of the Gold German Cross
Recipients of the Knight's Cross of the Iron Cross
Recipients of the Military Merit Cross (Mecklenburg-Schwerin), 1st class
German prisoners of war in World War II held by the United Kingdom
People from the Province of Schleswig-Holstein
People from Plön (district)